Atina Bojadži (13 March 1944 – 28 December 2010) was a Yugoslav marathon swimmer of Aromanian Macedonian descent. She crossed the English Channel in 1969, being the first woman from Yugoslavia to do so. Nicknamed the "Ohrid Dolphin" after her lakeside hometown, Bojadži won several national and international long-distance swimming races. She became the first woman from former Yugoslavia to swim across the English Channel in 1969. The achievement inspired a 1977 movie about her life and earned her sporting honors in her native Macedonia after it declared independence in 1991.

References

1944 births
2010 deaths
Sportspeople from Ohrid
Macedonian female swimmers
Yugoslav female swimmers
English Channel swimmers
Aromanian sportspeople
Macedonian people of Aromanian descent
Yugoslav people of Aromanian descent